William Sloan (September 10, 1867 – March 2, 1928) was a Canadian businessman and Liberal politician. He was Member of Parliament for Comox-Atlin from 1904 until 1909, when he resigned to provide a seat for William Templeman.

Born in Wingham, Ontario, Sloan continued to be active in provincial politics, serving as MLA for Nanaimo from 1916 until his death in 1928. A minister in the Liberal cabinets of the time, Sloan held the posts of Minister of Mines, Commissioner of Fisheries, Clerk of the Executive Council, and Provincial Secretary.

His son Gordon became a member of the provincial assembly and served in the province's cabinet and in the B.C. Court of Appeal.

References
 

1867 births
1928 deaths
British Columbia Liberal Party MLAs
Liberal Party of Canada MPs
Members of the House of Commons of Canada from British Columbia
People from Wingham, Ontario